Galal Ahmad Amin (1935 – 25 September 2018) was an award-winning professor of economics at the American University in Cairo and Egyptian economist and commentator. He was critical of the economic and cultural dependency of Egypt upon the West.

Biography
Amin was born in Egypt in 1935, the son of judge and academic Ahmad Amin. Hussein Ahmad Amin, an Egyptian writer and diplomat, was his brother. 

Amin studied at Cairo University, graduating LL.B. in 1955 before studying for diplomas in economics and public law. Receiving a government grant to study in Britain, Amin gained a M.S. (1961) and Ph.D. (1964) in economics from London School of Economics. From 1964 to 1974, he taught economics at Ain Shams University, also working as economic advisor for the Kuwait Fund for Economic Development from 1969 to 1974. After a year's teaching at UCLA in 1978–1979, Amin joined the American University in Cairo. He also contributed a weekly column to Al-Shorouk for several years.

Historian Albert Hourani describes Amin's writing as "forceful," particularly his argument in Mihnat al- iqtisad wa’l-thaqafa fi Misr (The Plight of the Economy and Culture in Egypt), among his better known books, which:"...tried to trace the connections between the infitah and a crisis of culture. The Egyptian and other Arab peoples had lost confidence in themselves...the infitah, and indeed the whole movement of events since the Egyptian revolution of 1952, had rested on an unsound basis: the false values of a consumer society in economic life, the domination of a ruling élite instead of genuine patriotic loyalty. Egyptians were importing whatever foreigners persuaded them that they should want, and this made for a permanent dependence. To be healthy, their political and economic life should be derived from their own moral values, which themselves could have no basis except in religion."Amin died on 25 September 2018.

Published works

 Food Supply and Economic Development; With Special Reference to Egypt, 1966
 The Modernization of Poverty : A study in the political economy of growth in nine Arab countries 1945-1970, 1974
 Egypt's Economic Predicament : a study in the interaction of external pressure, political folly, and social tension in Egypt, 1960-1990, 1995
 'Whatever Happened to the Egyptians: changes in Egyptian society from 1950 to the present, AUC Press,  2000
 Whatever Else Happened to the Egyptians: from the revolution to the age of globalization, AUC Press,  2004
 The Illusion of Progress in the Arab world: A Critique of Western Misconstructions, 2005. Translated by David Wilmsen.
 Egypt in the Era of Hosni Mubarak (1981-2011), 2011
 Whatever Happened to the Egyptian Revolution?, 2014. Translated by Jonathan Wright.

References

External links
 AUC webpage
 Curriculum Vitae
 A Radical Break with the Past: Interview with Susanne Schanda, 25 March 2011. Translated from the German by Aingeal Flanagan

1935 births
2018 deaths
20th-century Egyptian economists
Academic staff of The American University in Cairo
Cairo University alumni
Alumni of the London School of Economics
Academic staff of Ain Shams University
21st-century Egyptian economists